The 2005–06 Bucknell Bison men's basketball team represented Bucknell University during the 2005–06 NCAA Division I men's basketball season. The Bison, led by head coach Pat Flannery, played their home games at Sojka Pavilion and were members of the Patriot League. They finished the season 27–5, 14–0 in Patriot League play to win the conference regular season title by three games. They won the Patriot League tournament to earn an automatic bid to the 2006 NCAA tournament where they defeated No. 8 seed Arkansas in the opening round. In the round of 32, the Bison were beaten by No. 1 seed Memphis. This was the second straight season the Bison reached the round of 32 of the NCAA Tournament.

Roster

Schedule and results

|-
!colspan=9 style=| Regular season

|-
!colspan=9 style=| Patriot League tournament

|-
!colspan=9 style=| NCAA tournament

,

Rankings

Awards and honors
Charles Lee – Patriot League Player of the Year

References

Bucknell Bison men's basketball seasons
Bucknell
Bucknell
Bucknell Bison
Bucknell Bison